Sulpicia (fl. 113 BC) was the wife of Quintus Fulvius Flaccus, and earned everlasting fame when she was determined to be the most chaste of all the Roman matrons.

Biography
The daughter of Servius Sulpicius Paterculus, Sulpicia was one of one hundred Roman matrons who were candidates to dedicate the statue of Venus Verticordia (the changer of hearts), who was believed "to turn the minds of women from vice to virtue." Using a method outlined in the Sibylline Books, ten were drawn by lot, and these examined to determine which was the purest and most virtuous.  Judged the most chaste, it fell to Sulpicia to dedicate the statue.  The story was so well known in ancient authors that famed Renaissance author Giovanni Boccaccio included it in his book On Famous Women, fifteen hundred years later.

The statue itself predates the temple in which it stood by over a hundred years, and so must originally have been dedicated someplace else—perhaps at the Temple of Venus Erycina on the Capitoline or the Temple of Venus Obsequens.

See also
 Veneralia
 Sulpicia (gens)

References

Bibliography
 Valerius Maximus, Factorum ac Dictorum Memorabilium libri IX (Nine Books of Memorable Deeds and Sayings), Henry J. Walker, trans., Hackett Publishing Company, Indianapolis (2004), .
 Gaius Plinius Secundus (Pliny the Elder), Naturalis Historia.
 Gaius Julius Solinus, De Mirabilis Mundi (The Wonders of the World).
 Giovanni Boccaccio, De mulieribus claris (On Famous Women), Virginia Brown, trans., Harvard University Press (2001), .
 "Sulpicia" (no. 2), in the Dictionary of Greek and Roman Biography and Mythology, William Smith, ed., Little, Brown and Company, Boston (1849).
 L. Richardson, Jr., A New Topographical Dictionary of Ancient Rome, Johns Hopkins University Press (1992).

2nd-century BC Roman women
Sulpicii